East Caroga Lake is located in the Town of Caroga by Caroga Lake, New York. The lake provides excellent warm water fishing and rainbow trout fishing. The lake is connected to West Caroga Lake by a small channel.
Origin of the name, "Caroga" is derived from the once nearby Indian Village known as "Caroga".

Fishing 

Fish found within East Caroga Lake include white sucker, rainbow trout, rock bass, chain pickerel, brown bullhead, yellow perch, pumpkinseed sunfish, and smallmouth bass. There are boat rentals available at the campground.

References 

Lakes of Fulton County, New York
Lakes of New York (state)